Asplenium is a genus of about 700 species of ferns, often treated as the only genus in the family Aspleniaceae, though other authors consider Hymenasplenium separate, based on molecular phylogenetic analysis of DNA sequences, a different chromosome count, and structural differences in the rhizomes. The type species for the genus is Asplenium marinum.

The most common vernacular name is spleenworts, applied to the more "typical" species. A. nidus and several similar species are called bird's-nest ferns, the Camptosorus group is known as walking ferns, and distinct names are applied to some other particularly well-known species.

Taxonomy and genetics
Many groups of species have been separated from Asplenium as segregate genera. These include Camptosorus, Ceterach, Phyllitis, and Tarachia, but these species can form hybrids with other Asplenium species and because of this are usually included in a more broadly defined Asplenium.

Some of the older classifications elevate the Aspleniaceae to the taxonomic rank of order as Aspleniales. The newer classifications place it in the subordinal group called eupolypods within the order Polypodiales. Within the eupolypods, Aspleniaceae belongs to a clade informally and provisionally known as eupolypods II.

It has been found that in some species, the chloroplast genome has evolved in complex and highly unusual ways. This makes standard cladistic analyses unsuited to resolve the phylogeny of that particular group of ferns, and even very sophisticated computational phylogenetics methods yield little information. In addition to hybridization running rampant in parts of this genus, there are also some species like the mother spleenwort (A. bulbiferum) or A. viviparum which mainly reproduce asexually, essentially cloning themselves over and over again. While most are diploid or tetraploid, some species (e.g. A. shuttleworthianum) are octoploid.

Uses
Both the scientific name and the common name "spleenwort" are derived from an old belief, based on the doctrine of signatures, that the fern was useful for ailments of the spleen, due to the spleen-shaped sori on the backs of the fronds. "-wort" is an ancient English term that simply means "plant" (compare German -wurz). The plants were thought to cause infertility in women.

Vitruvius relates the story of the name thus:

... certain pastures in Crete, on each side of the river Pothereus, which separates the two Cretan states of Gnosus and Gortyna. There are cattle at pasture on the right and left banks of that river, but while the cattle that feed near Gnosus have the usual spleen, those on the other side near Gortyna have no perceptible spleen. On investigating the subject, physicians discovered on this side a kind of herb which the cattle chew and thus make their spleen small. The herb is therefore gathered and used as a medicine for the cure of splenetic people. The Cretans call it ἄσπληνον.
 

A few of these ferns have some economic importance in the horticulture trade. The bird's-nest ferns (A. nidus and several very similar, closely related species) are commonly found for sale as a house plant. The Australian mother spleenwort (A. bulbiferum) is sometimes available at greenhouses, and is of interest, along with the related A. viviparum, for the many small bulblets borne on the fronds that may grow into new plants. This characteristic is also shared with the eastern North American walking fern (A. rhizophyllum) and several Mexican species including A. palmeri. The ebony spleenwort A. platyneuron is also sometimes sold in nurseries as a hardy plant. However, many spleenworts are epipetric or epiphytic and difficult to cultivate.

Asplenium species are used as food plants by the larvae of some Lepidoptera species including Batrachedra bedelliella which feeds exclusively on A. nidus. For diseases of Asplenium, see List of foliage plant diseases (Polypodiaceae).

Selected species

 Asplenium adiantum-nigrum L. – black spleenwort (= A. lucidum Burm.f.)
 Asplenium adiantum-nigrum ssp. adiantum-nigrum
 Asplenium adiantum-nigrum ssp. serpentini (Tausch) Koch
 Asplenium adulterinum Milde – ladder spleenwort
 Asplenium aequibasis
 Asplenium aethiopicum
 Asplenium africanum
 Asplenium × alternifolium Wulf.
 Asplenium anceps
 Asplenium angustum Sw.
 Asplenium antiquum Makino
 Asplenium ascensionis S.Watson
 Asplenium attenuatum R.Br.
 Asplenium aureum (sometimes in Ceterach)
 Asplenium auritum
 Asplenium australasicum (J.Sm.) Hook. – crow's-nest fern
 Asplenium australasicum f. australasicum
 Asplenium australasicum f. robinsonii
 Asplenium azoricum Lovis, Rasbach & Reichst.
 Asplenium bifrons
 Asplenium billottii – lanceolate spleenwort
 Asplenium bipinnatifidum
 Asplenium brachycarpum
 Asplenium bradleyi
 Asplenium bulbiferum – mother spleenwort, hen and chickens fern, mouku (Māori)
 Asplenium carnarvonense - Brownsey
 Asplenium caudatum
 Asplenium ceterach – rustyback fern (sometimes in Ceterach)
 Asplenium chathamense Brownsey
 Asplenium chihuahuense Baker
 Asplenium compressum Sw.
 Asplenium congestum
 Asplenium corderoanum
 Asplenium crinicaule
 Asplenium cristatum
 Asplenium cuneifolium Viv. (= A. forsteri auct. non Sadl.) – serpentine spleenwort
 Asplenium cymbifolium
 Asplenium daghestanicum H.Christ – Dagestanian spleenwort
 Asplenium dalhousiae (sometimes in Ceterach)
 Asplenium dareoides
 Asplenium daucifolium – Mauritius spleenwort
 Asplenium difforme R.Br.
 Asplenium fissum
 Asplenium dimorphum – Norfolk Island Spleenwort
 Asplenium divaricatum
 Asplenium dregeanum
 Asplenium × ebenoides R.R.Scott
 Asplenium ecuadorense Stolze
 Asplenium feei Kunze ex Fée
 Asplenium fissum
 Asplenium flabellifolium – necklace fern
 Asplenium flaccidum G.Forst. – weeping spleenwort, hanging spleenwort
 Asplenium fontanum (L.) Bernh. – smooth rock spleenwort
 Asplenium forisiense – rock spleenwort
 Asplenium formosum
 Asplenium gemmiferum Schrad.
 Asplenium × germanicum
 Asplenium gueinzii Mett.
 Asplenium goudeyi Lord Howe Island
Asplenium haughtonii – Barn Fern
 Asplenium hemionitis
 Asplenium hermannii-christii Fomin – Hermann Christ's asplenium
 Asplenium hookerianum Colenso
 Asplenium hybridum
 Asplenium incisum
 Asplenium × jacksonii Alston – Jackson's spleenwort (sterile, triploid hybrid between Asplenium adiantum-nigrum and Asplenium scolopendrium) 
 Asplenium × kenzoi - oni-hinokishida, cultivated in Japan
 Asplenium komarovii - Akasawa
 Asplenium laciniatum
 Asplenium lamprophyllum Carse
 Asplenium laserpitiifolium – Johnston River fern
 Asplenium lepidum C.Presl
 Asplenium listeri – Christmas Island spleenwort
 Asplenium longissimum
 Asplenium lucidum
 Asplenium lunulatum – Hen-and-chicks
 Asplenium lyallii
 Asplenium macedonicum
 Asplenium majoricum
 Asplenium marinum – sea spleenwort
 Asplenium × microdon T Moore – Moore's spleenwort (hybrid between Asplenium scolopendrium and Asplenium obovatum subsp lanceolatum)
 Asplenium milnei Carruth
 Asplenium montanum – mountain spleenwort
 Asplenium musifolium
 Asplenium nidus – bird's-nest fern
 Asplenium normale
 Asplenium obliquum
 Asplenium oblongifolium Colenso – shining spleenwort (= A. lucidum auct. non Burm.f., sensu G.Forst.)
 Asplenium obovatum
 Asplenium obtusatum G.Forst.
 Asplenium obtusatum ssp. northlandicum (Brownsey) Ogle (possibly distinct species)
 Asplenium obtusatum 'Chile' (possibly distinct species, sometimes included in A. obliquum)
 Asplenium oligolepidum C.Chr. (= A. lucidum auct. non Burm.f., sensu G.Forst.)
 Asplenium oligophlebium
 Asplenium onopteris L. – western black spleenwort, Irish spleenwort (sometimes included in A. adiantum-nigrum)
 Asplenium pacificum
 Asplenium paleaceum R.Br. – chaffy spleenwort
 Asplenium palmeri
 Asplenium parvum
 Asplenium petrarchae
 Asplenium pinnatifidum – lobed spleenwort
 Asplenium planicaule
 Asplenium platybasis Kunze ex Mett.
 Asplenium platyneuron – ebony spleenwort
 Asplenium polyodon G.Forst. – sickle spleenwort
 Asplenium praemorsum
 Asplenium prolongatum Hook.
 Asplenium pteridoides Baker
 Asplenium resiliens – black-stemmed spleenwort
 Asplenium rhizophyllum – American walking fern (sometimes in Camptosorus)
 Asplenium richardii
 Asplenium ruprechtii – Asian walking fern (sometimes in Camptosorus)
 Asplenium ruta-muraria L. – wall-rue
 Asplenium rutifolium
 Asplenium sagittatum – Mule's spleenwort (sometimes in Phyllitis)
 Asplenium sandersonii Hook.
 Asplenium × sarniense Sleep Guernsey Spleenwort
 Asplenium schizotrichum Copel.
 Asplenium schweinfurthii
 Asplenium scleroprium
 Asplenium scolopendrium – hart's-tongue fern (sometimes in Phyllitis)
 Asplenium scolopendrium var. americanum – American Hart's-tongue
 Asplenium seelosii
 Asplenium septentrionale – forked spleenwort, northern spleenwort
 Asplenium septentrionale × trichomanes Wulf.
 Asplenium serra
 Asplenium serratum – wild bird's-nest fern
 Asplenium sessilifolium
 Asplenium shuttleworthianum Kunze
 Asplenium simplicifrons F.Muell.
 Asplenium splendens
 Asplenium surrogatum P.S.Green
 Asplenium tenerum G.Forst.
 Asplenium terrestre
 Asplenium theciferum (Kunth) Mett.
 Asplenium thunbergii
 Asplenium trichomanes – maidenhair spleenwort
 Asplenium trichomanes ssp. quadrivalens D.E. Meyer
 Asplenium trichomanes ssp. trichomanes
 Asplenium trichomanes subsp. coriaceifolium
 Asplenium tutwilerae B.R.Keener & L.J.Davenport
 Asplenium vespertinum
 Asplenium vieillardii Mett.
 Asplenium virens
 Asplenium viride – green spleenwort
 Asplenium vittiforme
 Asplenium viviparum

See also
 Mount Asplenium
 Phyllocladus aspleniifolius (Celery-top Pine, a conifer with Asplenium-like leaves)
Asplenium hybrids

References

 
Epiphytes
Fern genera
Taxa named by Carl Linnaeus